The wrestling events at the 2015 European Games were held at the Heydar Aliyev Arena, Baku from 13 to 20 June 2015. 24 events were held, 16 in freestyle across both sexes, and 8 in the Greco-Roman style, for men only.

Medalists

Men's freestyle

Men's Greco-Roman

Women's freestyle

Medal table

Participating nations 
A total of 453 athletes from 39 nations competed in wrestling at the 2015 European Games:

References

External links

Results book

 
Sports at the 2015 European Games
European Games
2015
International wrestling competitions hosted by Azerbaijan